Sir Anthony Michael Beaumont-Dark (11 October 1932 – 2 April 2006) was a British politician.

He was born in Birmingham on 11 October 1932, the son of a businessman. He was educated at Cedarhurst School, Solihull; Shirley College; Birmingham College of Arts and Crafts; and Birmingham University. He trained as an investment analyst and became a stockbroker by profession.

He was a Conservative City Councillor for Birmingham from 1956 to 1967, and stood unsuccessfully for Birmingham Aston in 1959 and 1964. Subsequently, he became MP for the constituency of Birmingham Selly Oak from 1979 to 1992. He was known for being a "rent-a-quote" MP who would deliver a pithy and memorable comment on almost any public issue.

He defeated Tom Litterick of the Labour Party in 1979, and served as a backbencher until his defeat in the 1992 general election by Dr Lynne Jones, the Labour candidate. He was knighted the same year.

References

External links
In the House of Commons Chancellor of the Exchequer Nigel Lawson uses an answer to a written question by Sir Anthony to announce the phasing out of the halfpenny coin BBC News, 1 February 1984.

1932 births
2006 deaths
Conservative Party (UK) MPs for English constituencies
People from Birmingham, West Midlands
UK MPs 1979–1983
UK MPs 1983–1987
UK MPs 1987–1992
Knights Bachelor
Politicians awarded knighthoods
Alumni of the University of Birmingham